George Gilbert Aimé Murray  (2 January 1866 – 20 May 1957) was an Australian-born British classical scholar and public intellectual, with connections in many spheres. He was an outstanding scholar of the language and culture of Ancient Greece, perhaps the leading authority in the first half of the twentieth century. He is the basis for the character of Adolphus Cusins in his friend George Bernard Shaw's play Major Barbara, and also appears as the chorus figure in Tony Harrison's play Fram.

He served as President of the Ethical Union (now Humanists UK) from 1929 to 1930 and was a delegate at the inaugural World Humanist Congress in 1952 which established Humanists International.  He was a leader of the League of Nations Society and the League of Nations Union, which promoted the League of Nations in Britain.

Early life 
Murray was born in Sydney, Australia. His father, Sir Terence Aubrey Murray, who died in 1873, had been a Member of the New South Wales Parliament; Gilbert's mother, Agnes Ann Murray (née Edwards), ran a girls' school in Sydney for a few years. Then, in 1877, Agnes emigrated with Gilbert to the UK, where she died in 1891.

Murray was educated at Merchant Taylors' School and St John's College, Oxford. He distinguished himself in writing in Greek and Latin: he won all the prizes awarded by Oxford.

Classicist

Academic career 
From 1889 to 1899, Murray was Professor of Greek at the University of Glasgow. There was a break in his academic career from 1899 to 1905, when he returned to Oxford; he interested himself in dramatic and political writing. After 1908 he was Regius Professor of Greek at the University of Oxford. In the same year he invited Ulrich von Wilamowitz-Moellendorff to Oxford, where the Prussian philologist delivered two lectures: Greek Historical Writing and Apollo (later, he would replicate them in Cambridge).

From 1925 to 1926, he was the Charles Eliot Norton Lecturer at Harvard University.
He had published his own journal, called the Hibbert Journal.

Greek drama 
Murray is perhaps now best known for his verse translations of Greek drama, which were popular and prominent in their time. As a poet he was generally taken to be a follower of Swinburne and had little sympathy from the modernist poets of the rising generation. The staging of Athenian drama in English did have its own cultural impact. He had earlier experimented with his own prose dramas, without much success.

Over time he worked through almost the entire canon of Athenian dramas (Aeschylus, Sophocles, Euripides in tragedy; Aristophanes in comedy). From Euripides, the Hippolytus and The Bacchae (together with The Frogs of Aristophanes; first edition, 1902); the Medea, Trojan Women, and Electra (1905–1907); Iphigenia in Tauris (1910); The Rhesus (1913) were presented at the Court Theatre, in London. In the United States Granville Barker and his wife Lillah McCarthy gave outdoor performances of The Trojan Women and Iphigenia in Tauris at various colleges (1915).

The translation of Œdipus Rex was a commission from W. B. Yeats. Until 1912 this could not have been staged for a British audience. Murray was drawn into the public debate on censorship that came to a head in 1907 and was pushed by William Archer, whom he knew well from Glasgow, George Bernard Shaw, and others such as John Galsworthy, J. M. Barrie and Edward Garnett. A petition was taken to Herbert Gladstone, then Home Secretary, early in 1908.

The Ritualists 
He was one of the scholars associated with Jane Harrison in the myth-ritual school of mythography. They met first in 1900. He wrote an appendix on the Orphic tablets for her 1903 book Prolegomena; he later contributed to her Themis (1912).

Francis Fergusson wrote

In public life

Liberal Party politics 
He was a lifelong supporter of the Liberal Party, lining up on the Irish Home Rule and non-imperialist sides of the splits in the party of the late nineteenth century. He supported temperance, and married into a prominent Liberal, aristocratic and temperance family, the Carlisles. He made a number of moves that might have taken him into parliamentary politics, initially by tentative thoughts about standing in elections during the 1890s. In 1901-2 he was in close contact with the Independent Labour Party. But the overall effect of the Second Boer War was to drive him back into the academic career he had put on hold in 1898, resigning his Glasgow chair (effective from April 1899).

He stood five times unsuccessfully for the University of Oxford constituency between 1919 and 1929. He continued support for the Asquith faction of Liberals, after the party was split again by Lloyd George. During the 1930s the Liberals as a party were crushed electorally, but Liberal thinkers continued to write; Murray was one of the signatory Next Five Years Group formed around Clifford Allen.

Activist 
As Regius Professor and literary figure, he had a platform to promote his views, which were many-sided but Whig-liberal. In 1912 he wrote an introduction to The Great Analysis: A Plea for a Rational World-Order, by his friend William Archer.

During World War I he became a pamphleteer, putting a reasoned war case. He also defended C. K. Ogden against criticism, and took a public interest in conscientious objection. Murray never took a pacifist line himself, broke an old friendship with Bertrand Russell early in the war, and supported British intervention in the Suez Crisis.

He was also involved as an internationalist in the League of Nations. He was a vice-president of the League of Nations Society from 1916, and in 1917 wrote influential articles in The Daily News. At the invitation of Jan Smuts he acted in 1921/2 as a League delegate for South Africa. He was an influential member of the International Committee on Intellectual Cooperation of the League from 1922 to 1939, being its president from 1928 to 1939.

Later he was a major influence in the setting-up of Oxfam and of the Students' International Union (later the Institute of World Affairs).

Involvement with Wells 
For a brief period Murray became closely involved with the novelist H. G. Wells. Initially this was in 1917 and connection with groups supporting a future League: Wells promoted a League of Free Nations Association (LFNA), an idea not in fact exclusive to him, since it had been 'up in the air' since Woodrow Wilson had started considering post-war settlements. Wells applied through the British propaganda office with which Murray had been connected since 1914. The two men corresponded from 1917 about League matters. Wells was bullish about pushing ahead with a British LFNA, Murray was involved already in the League of Nations Society (LNS), though not active. The political position was delicate, as Murray understood and Wells may not have: the LNS overlapped with the Union of Democratic Control, which was too far towards the pacifist end of the spectrum of opinion to be effective in that time and context. Eventually in 1918 the LFNA was set up around Welsh Liberal MP David Davies, and then shortly the LFNA and LNS merged as the League of Nations Union.

Two years later, Wells called on Murray, and Murray's New College colleague Ernest Barker, to lend their names as advisers on his The Outline of History. Their names duly appeared on the title page. Murray had to give evidence in the plagiarism case Deeks v. Wells that arose in 1925.

Psychical research 

Murray held a deep interest in psychical research. Between 1916 and 1924, he conducted 236 experiments into telepathy and reported 36% as successful, although it was suggested that the results could be explained by hyperaesthesia as he could hear what was being said by the sender.

Murray was the President of the Society for Psychical Research in 1915–1916 and 1952.

Humanism 
Murray identified as a humanist, and even served as a President of the British Ethical Union (later known as the British Humanist Association). He joined the Rationalist Press Association, and in 1952 was a delegate to the inaugural World Humanist Congress which founded Humanists International. He wrote and broadcast extensively on religion (Greek, Stoic and Christian); and wrote several books dealing with his version of humanism, which he espoused as a naturalistic philosophy, contrasted with Christianity and revealed religion in general. He was President of the British Ethical Union (now Humanists UK) from 1929 to 1930.

A phrase from his 1910 lectures Four Stages of Greek Religion enjoyed public prominence: the "failure of nerve" of the Hellenistic world, of which a turn to irrationalism was symptomatic.

Murray was baptised as a Roman Catholic; his father was a Catholic, his mother a Protestant.  His daughter Rosalind (later Rosalind Toynbee), a Catholic convert, attacked his atheism in her book of apologetics, The Good Pagan's Failure (1939). About a month before he died, when he was bedridden, his daughter Rosalind called the local Catholic priest to see him. In an article in The Times following his death, however, his son Stephen made clear that Rosalind and Catholic friends did 'not want it thought that they claim he died a Roman Catholic'. Stephen said that his sister 'would not dream of making a public claim that he would re-enter the Church.'

Murray did not raise his own children to be religious. His great-granddaughter, Polly Toynbee, followed in his footsteps, becoming President of the British Humanist Association from 2009-2012.

Awards and honours 
He refused a knighthood in 1912, though he was appointed to the Order of Merit in 1941. He received honorary degrees from Glasgow, Birmingham, and Oxford.

He gave the 1914 Shakespeare Lecture of the British Academy. He gave the 1941 Andrew Lang lecture.

Minor planet 941 Murray is named after him, for his support of Austria after World War I.

Family 
Murray's father was Sir Terence Aubrey Murray and his brother Sir Hubert Murray. Murray's mother, Agnes Ann Murray (née Edwards), was a cousin of the dramatist W. S. Gilbert.

Murray married Lady Mary Henrietta Howard (1865–1956), daughter of George Howard, 9th Earl of Carlisle. When her mother Rosalind Howard, Countess of Carlisle died in 1921, Castle Howard was left to Lady Mary.  However, she passed it on to her surviving brother Geoffrey, retaining an estate in Cumberland with an income of c£5,000pa.

Gilbert and Lady Mary had five children, two daughters (Rosalind, 1890–1967 and Agnes Elizabeth 1894–1922) and three sons (Denis, Basil, and Stephen) including:
 Basil Murray, 1903–1937, who was a well-known and rather louche figure, and friend of Evelyn Waugh. His wife was a daughter of the artist Algernon Newton RA, and a sister of Robert Newton.
 The writer Venetia Murray (3 January 1932 – 26 September 2004) was Basil's daughter, as was
 Ann Paludan (1928–2014), writer on Chinese history.
 Mark Jones, former director of the Victoria and Albert Museum, is Ann's son.
 Agnes Elizabeth Murray (1894–1922). Attended Somerville College, Oxford, but gave up her studies to spend two years nursing before serving as an RAF dispatch rider and as an ambulance driver for the First Aid Nursing Yeomanry Corps. She died of peritonitis in France.
 Rosalind Murray (1890–1967), writer, married Arnold J. Toynbee, and was the mother of
 Philip Toynbee, critic, father of
 Polly Toynbee, journalist.
 Stephen (February 1908 – July 1994), radical lawyer, married the architect Margaret Gillet. Stephen gave up law and became a farmer and lived at "Greenside" farm, Hallbankgate, Cumbria.  He was chairman of Border Rural District Council (1962–66), of Cumberland County Council, of the Lake District Special Planning Board (1977–81) and of Cumbria County Council (1985–87).  They were parents of
 Gilbert, killed in climbing accident in Fox's Glacier New Zealand in the 1950s
 Alexander (Sandy), academic medievalist historian at Oxford University
 Robin, academic, economist, chair of Twin Trading
 Hubert, architect, now practising in Boston, MA, USA
The four children were evacuated during the Second World War from London to the Sands House Hotel, Brampton, Cumberland, which was converted to temperance status by Lady Rosalind, and run by Mr and Mrs James Warwick, formerly in her service, with their daughter Charlotte Elizabeth. She became an enduring friend of the boys and an unfinished letter to her was found on Gilbert's body after the accident.

Works

Translations 
 Andromache (1900)
 A text edition of Euripides, Fabulae, in three volumes (1901, 1904, 1910)
 Euripides, Hippolytus; The Bacchae (1902)
 Aristophanes, The Frogs (1902)
 Euripides, The Trojan Women (1905)
 Euripides, Electra (1905)
 Euripides Medea (1910)
 Iphigenia in Tauris (1911)
 Oedipus King of Thebes (1911)
 The Story of Nefrekepta: From a Demotic Papyrus (1911)
 Euripides, Rhesus (1913)
 Andromache (1913)
 Alcestis (1915)
 Agamemnon (1920)
 Choephoroe (1923)
 Eumenides of Aeschylus (1926)
 The Oresteia (1928)
 The Suppliant Women (1930)
 Prometheus Bound, Translated into English Rhyming Verse (London: Allen & Unwin, 1931)
 Seven Against Thebes (1935)
 A text edition of Aeschylus, Septem quae supersunt Tragoediae (OCT. 1937. 1955)
 The Persians (1939)
 Antigone (1941)
 The Rape of the Locks: The Perikeiromene of Menander (1942)
 Fifteen Greek Plays (1943) with others
 The Arbitration: the Epitrepontes of Menander (1945)
 Oedipus at Colonus (1948)
 The Birds (1950)
 Euripides, Ion (1954)
 Collected Plays of Euripides (1954)
 The Knights (1956)

Classical studies 
 The Place of Greek in Education (1889) Inaugural Lecture
 A History of Ancient Greek Literature (1897)
 The Rise of the Greek Epic (1907) third edition (1924) Harvard University lectures
 Greek Historical Writing, and Apollo: Two Lectures (1908) with Ulrich von Wilamowitz-Moellendorff
 The Interpretation of Ancient Greek Literature (1909) Inaugural Lecture
 Ancient Greek Literature (1911)
 English Literature and the Classics (1912) section on Tragedy, editor George Stuart Gordon
 Four Stages of Greek Religion (1913)
  (1913) in the Home University Library
 Hamlet and Orestes: A Study in Traditional Types (1914) Annual Shakespeare Lecture 1914
 The Stoic Philosophy (1915) Conway Lecture
 Aristophanes and the War Party, A Study in the Contemporary Criticism of the Peloponnesian War (1919) Creighton Lecture 1918, as Our Great War and The Great War of the Ancient Greeks (US, 1920)
 Essays and Addresses (London: Allen & Unwin, 1921).
 Greek Historical Thought: from Homer to the Age of Heraclius (1924) with Arnold J. Toynbee
 Five Stages of Greek Religion (Oxford: Clarendon Press, 1925); (London: Watts, 1935 edition)
 The Classical Tradition in Poetry (London: Milford, 1927) Charles Eliot Norton Lectures
 Aristophanes: A Study (1933)
 Aeschylus: The Creator of Tragedy (1940)
 The Wife of Heracles (1947)
 Greek Studies (Oxford:  University Press, 1946)
 Hellenism and the Modern World (1953) radio talks

Festschrift
 Greek Poetry and Life, Essays presented to Gilbert Murray on his Seventieth Birthday, 2 January 1936 (1936)

Other 
 Gobi or Shamo novel (1889); 1890 3rd edition
 Carlyon Sahib, a drama in Four Acts (1899)
 Liberalism and the Empire: Three Essays with Francis W. Hirst and John L. Hammond (1900)
  Annual Shakespeare Lecture of the British Academy (1914)
 Thoughts on the War pamphlet (1914)
 The Foreign Policy of Sir Edward Grey, 1906–1915  online text (1915)
 Ethical Problems of the War an address (1915)
 Herd Instinct and the War A Lecture reprinted in The International Crisis in Its Ethical and Psychological Aspects (1915)
 How can war ever be right? Oxford Pamphlets No 18/Ist Krieg je berechtigt?/La guerre. Peut-elle jamais se justifier? (1915)
 Impressions of Scandinavia in War Time (1916) pamphlet, reprint from the Westminster Gazette
 The United States and the War pamphlet (1916)
 The Way Forward: Three Articles on Liberal Policy pamphlet (1917)
 Great Britain's Sea Policy – A Reply to an American Critic pamphlet, reprinted from The Atlantic Monthly (1917)
 Faith, War and Policy (1917)
 The League of Nations and the Democratic Idea (1918)
 Religio Grammatici: The Religion Of A Man Of Letters Presidential Address to the Classical Association 8 January 1918 (1918)
 Foreword to My Mission to London 1912–1914 by Prince Lichnowsky, the German ambassador in London who had warned Berlin that Britain would fight in August 1914. Cassel & Co. London. (1918)
 Wells, Herbert George, Lionel Curtis, William Archer, Henry Wickham Steed, Alfred Zimmern, John Alfred Spender, James Bryce Bryce, and Gilbert Murray. The Idea of a League of Nations (Boston, The Atlantic Monthly Press, 1919).
 Satanism and the World Order Adamson Lecture (1920)
 The League of Nations and its Guarantees League of Nations Union pamphlet (1920)
 Essays and Addresses (1921)
 The Problem of Foreign Policy: A Consideration of Present Dangers and the Best Methods for Meeting Them (1921)
 Tradition and Progress (1922)
 The Ordeal of This Generation: The War, the League and the Future Halley Stewart Lectures 1928 (1930)
 Augustan Book of Poetry volume 41 (1931)
 The Intelligent Man's Way To Prevent War with others (1933)
 Problems of Peace (Eighth Series) with others (1933)
 Then and Now (1935)
 Liberality and Civilisation 1937 Hibbert Lectures (1938)
 Stoic, Christian and Humanist (1940)
 The Deeper Causes of the War and its Issues with others (1940)
 World Order Papers, No. 2 (1940) pamphlet, The Royal Institute of International Affairs
 Anchor of Civilisation Philip Maurice Deneke Lecture (1942)
 A Conversation with Bryce James Bryce Memorial Lecture (1943)
 Myths and Ethics, or Humanism and the World's Need Conway Hall lecture (1944)
 Humanism: Three BBC talks with Julian Huxley and Joseph Houldsworth Oldham (1944)
 Victory and After (1945)
 From the League to the U.N. (1948)
 Spires of Libertywith others (1948)
 Andrew Lang: The Poet Andrew Lang Lecture 1947 (1948)
 The Meaning of Freedom essays, with others (1956)
 Humanist Essays taken from Essays and Addresses, Stoic, Christian and Humanist (1964)

See also 
 League of Nations Union
 Liberalism in the United Kingdom

Notes

Further reading and references 
 Gahan, Peter. "Bernard Shaw's Dionysian Trilogy: Reworkings of Gilbert Murray's Translation of Euripides's Bacchae in Major Barbara, Misalliance, and Heartbreak House." Shaw 37.1 (2017): 28–74.
 Stray, Christopher, ed. Gilbert Murray Reassessed: Hellenism, Theatre, and International Politics (Oxford UP, 2007) DOI:10.1093/acprof:oso/9780199208791.003.0013
 Arnold J. Toynbee and Jean Smith (editors) (1960), An Unfinished Autobiography
 West, Francis. Gilbert Murray: A Life (1984)
 Duncan Wilson (1987), Gilbert Murray OM
 Wilson, Peter. "Gilbert Murray and International Relations: Hellenism, liberalism, and international intellectual cooperation as a path to peace." Review of International Studies 37.2 (2011): 881–909. online
 Wrigley, Amanda. "Greek drama in the first six decades of the twentieth century: tradition, identity, migration." Comparative drama (2010): 371–384. online

External links 

 
 
 
 

1866 births
1957 deaths
English classical scholars
English essayists
English translators
English dramatists and playwrights
Scholars of ancient Greek literature
Fellows of Christ Church, Oxford
Harvard University faculty
Parapsychologists
People educated at Merchant Taylors' School, Northwood
Pamphleteers
People from Sydney
Australian members of the Order of Merit
Recipients of the Pour le Mérite (civil class)
Alumni of St John's College, Oxford
Regius Professors of Greek (University of Oxford)
Telepaths
People associated with Conway Hall Ethical Society
Classical scholars of the University of Glasgow
British male essayists
English male dramatists and playwrights
Translators of Ancient Greek texts
Fellows of the British Academy
Liberal Party (UK) parliamentary candidates
Australian emigrants to England
Australian people of Irish descent
Australian people of English descent
English people of Irish descent
English male non-fiction writers
Presidents of the Classical Association